Driscoll Children's Hospital is a children's hospital located in Corpus Christi, Texas and founded as a charity children's hospital in 1953 by the last-will and testament of Clara Driscoll with the assistance of her primary physician Dr. McIver Furman.  In 1970 Driscoll Children's Hospital had its status changed from charity only to not for profit.  Driscoll Children's Hospital is the 7th largest employer in Corpus Christi.  Driscoll was the first hospital in south Texas to provide pediatric emergency services and also to perform an organ transplant.  It is accredited by the Joint Commission (JC).  Driscoll Children's Hospital also operates the only asthma camp in south Texas, Camp Easy Breathers.

Amidst the COVID-19 pandemic in the state, the hospital reported 8 cases of the disease among hospital employees.

References

Children's hospitals in the United States
Hospital buildings completed in 1953
Hospitals in Texas
Buildings and structures in Corpus Christi, Texas
Hospitals established in 1953
Children's hospitals in Texas